Levin Gale (April 24, 1784 – December 18, 1834) was an American politician.  Born in Elkton, Maryland, Gale attended the common schools, studied law, and was admitted to the bar and practiced in Elkton.  He was member of the Maryland State Senate in 1816, and was elected from the sixth district of Maryland as a Jacksonian candidate to the Twentieth Congress, and served from March 4, 1827, to March 3, 1829.  He declined to be a candidate for renomination in 1828, and resumed the practice of law.  He died in Elkton.

His father, George Gale, was also a Congressman from Maryland.

References

1784 births
1834 deaths
Maryland state senators
People from Elkton, Maryland
Jacksonian members of the United States House of Representatives from Maryland
19th-century American politicians